The 2013 Nebraska Cornhuskers football team represented the University of Nebraska in the 2013 NCAA Division I FBS football season. The team was coached by Bo Pelini and played their home games at Memorial Stadium in Lincoln, Nebraska.

Before the season

Recruiting

Scholarship recruits

Walk-on recruits

Schedule

Roster and coaching staff

Depth chart

Game summaries

Wyoming
This was the Cowboys' first visit to Lincoln since 1994, when Nebraska defeated the Cowboys 42–32 en route to a national championship. The two teams last played in 2011, when Nebraska defeated the Cowboys 38–14 in Laramie. In the week leading up to the game, Pelini handed out seven Blackshirts to his defense. This was the first time during Pelini's tenure that he has handed them out prior to the start of the season. In the game, both  Ameer Abdullah and Imani Cross rushed for more than 100 yards. Despite the victory, the Nebraska defense allowed Wyoming to accumulate 602 yards of offense, the second-most allowed ever by Nebraska in a win. With Nebraska's victory they now lead the all-time series 7–0.

Source:

Wyoming Game starters

Southern Miss
The Huskers hosted the Golden Eagles for the second straight year, with the Huskers winning 49–20 in 2012. This game was originally scheduled to be hosted by Southern Miss in Hattiesburg, Mississippi, but the game was sold back to Lincoln to make more money for the visiting team after considering playing the game in New Orleans or Kansas City.  Following this year's win, Nebraska now leads the series 4–1. USM won in Lincoln in 2004.

Source:

Southern Miss Game starters

UCLA
The UCLA Bruins traveled to Memorial Stadium for the first time since a 49–21 loss in 1994. This was the second game in a home-home series, with the Bruins winning in Pasadena 36–30 in 2012. Nebraska led 21–3 midway through the second quarter before UCLA scored a touchdown before halftime. In the third quarter, UCLA scored 28 straight points to take a 38–21 lead against Nebraska before adding a field goal late in the game. UCLA's win tied the series 6–6, until Nebraska took the lead after defeating the Bruins in the 2015 Foster Farms Bowl. Nebraska wore alternate uniforms in this game created by Adidas. The game set a Memorial Stadium attendance record with 91,471 in attendance. The record was broken the next season in the Miami at Nebraska game, with 91,585 in attendance.

Source:

UCLA Game starters

South Dakota State
The South Dakota State Jackrabbits made their third trip ever to Lincoln, falling to the Huskers previously in 1963 and 2010.  After trailing 17–14, Nebraska scored 38 straight points en route to a 59–20 win over South Dakota State.  The Huskers amassed 645 yards of total offense with 310 yards passing and 335 rushing, the first time in school history that Nebraska broke the 300-yard barrier in both rushing and passing.  Starting quarterback Taylor Martinez sat out this game with a turf toe injury, so backups Tommy Armstrong Jr. and Ron Kellogg III took his place. Tommy Armstrong went 12-of-15 for 169 yards with a TD in the win, while teammate Ron Kellog was 8-of-9 for 136 yards and a 1 TD of his own. Ameer Abdullah was the top Husker rusher with 139 yards and a TD on 15 carries while Imani Cross added 60 yards rushing and 2 TDs on 10 carries. Quincy Enunwa was the top receiving target with 6 catches for 78 yards, while Tyler Wullenwaber added 47 yards and a TD on two catches. For SDSU, Austin Sumner was 19-of-29 for 238 yards with 2 INTs. Zach Zenner had 21 carries for 202 yards, the 10th most individual rushing yards ever allowed by the Huskers, and 2 TDs. Cam Jones had 6 catches for 68 yards in the loss.

Source:

SDSU Game starters

Illinois
Illinois made their first trip to Memorial Stadium since 1985.  This was the first year of back to back trips to Lincoln for the Fighting Illini. Following this win the Huskers now lead the all-time series 8–2–1.

Source:

Illinois Game starters

Purdue
This was the second meeting ever between the schools. Purdue won the only other meeting, 28–0, in 1958 in West Lafayette. Purdue scored in the final minute of the game to avoid being shut out in a 44–7 Nebraska win.  Nebraska's defense held Purdue to 216 total yards of offense while recording five sacks and forcing a pair of turnovers. The Boilermakers gained 32 yards rushing in the contest. Nebraska gained 435 total yards with 184 through the air and 251 on the ground. Ron Kellogg III was the top passer for the Huskers, going 10-of-13 for 141 yards and a TD. Ameer Abdullah added 126 yards rushing on 20 carries with a TD and Quincy Enunwa was the top Husker receiver with four catches for 72 yards and a score.  David Santos led the Huskers in tackles with five while Randy Gregory had two sacks and a fumble recovery.

Source:

Purdue Game starters

Minnesota
Nebraska and Minnesota met for the 54th time in a series that began in 1900. Nebraska has played Minnesota more times than any other Big Ten Conference member. Coming into the game the Golden Gophers led the all-time series 29–22–2, but Nebraska had won the last 16 games in the series, including the last two since joining the Big Ten Conference.

In the game, after jumping out to a 10–0 lead, Minnesota used its run game to beat Nebraska for the first time since 1960, ending a streak of 16 straight losses to the Huskers.  The Gophers outgained the Huskers in total offense 430–328 and gained 271 yards on the ground.  The game saw the return of Taylor Martinez to the starting lineup.  He went 16-of-30 for 139 yards with 1 TD and 1 INT.  Ameer Abdullah added 165 yards rushing on 19 carries in the loss.

Source:

Minnesota Game starters

Northwestern
This was the third straight year as Big 10 members against each other, with Northwestern winning 28–25 in 2011 and Nebraska winning in 2012, 29–28.

Jordan Westerkamp caught a tipped hail mary pass in the end zone as time expired from Ron Kellogg III to give Nebraska a 27–24 win over the Northwestern Wildcats. The Huskers outgained the Wildcats in the contest 472 yards to 326. Tommy Armstrong was 15-of-29 for 173 yards with 1 TD and 3 INTs in the win. Ameer Abdullah had 127 yards rushing on 24 carries and Jordan Westerkamp had four catches for 104 yards and a TD. Nebraska moves to 5–2 all-time against Northwestern.

Source:

Northwestern Game starters

Michigan
Nebraska mounted a late fourth quarter drive to win 17–13, tying the all-time series with Michigan at 4–4–1. The loss snaps a 19-game home winning streak under coach Brady Hoke at Michigan Stadium. The Huskers scored the first 10 points of the game in the first quarter, then Michigan scored the next 13 before Nebraska would come back with the game-winning touchdown with just over two minutes left in the game. The Huskers outgained the Wolverines in total offense 273 yards to 175 while holding Michigan to minus-21 yards rushing in the contest. Tommy Armstrong was 11-of-19 for 139 yards with a TD, Ameer Abdullah had 27 carries for 105 yards with one rushing and one receiving TD and Quincy Enunwa had 7 catches for 69 yards to lead the Huskers offensively. Defensively, Randy Gregory came up with three sacks of Michigan QB Devin Gardner to lead a Blackshirt defense that produced seven sacks on the day.

Source:

Michigan Game starters

Michigan State
Michigan State, previously 0–7 against Nebraska, won their first ever game in the series with a 41–28 win over the Huskers. Nebraska outgained the Spartans in total offense 392 yards to 361 but was unable to overcome five turnovers, which resulted in 24 Michigan State points. MSU also held an advantage in time of possession at 38:37 to 21:23. Ameer Abdullah was the first runner this season to gain 100 yards on the Spartans, the number one ranked defense in the country coming into the game, with 123 yards on 22 carries. 

Source:

Michigan State Game starters

Penn State
Nebraska was able to convert a field goal in overtime to give Nebraska a 23–20 win on the road over the Nittany Lions.  The Huskers tied the game at 20–20 late in the fourth quarter on a 19-yard field goal by Pat Smith to force overtime.  Penn State missed a 37-yard attempt in their overtime period while Smith connected on a 42-yarder for the win.  Nebraska was outgained in total offense by Penn State 387 to 360 yards.  Ron Kellogg III was 20-of-34 for 191 yards with a TD.  Ameer Abdullah had 25 carries for 147 yards rushing and the receiving corps was led by Jordan Westerkamp with five catches for 62 yards and Quincy Enunwa who had three catches for 42 yards and a TD.

Source:

Penn State Game starters

Iowa

Meeting for the Heroes Trophy. Following the Husker's loss Nebraska now leads the series by a mark of 28–13–3.

Source:

Iowa Game starters

Gator Bowl
This year's Gator Bowl was a rematch of last year's Capital One Bowl that was won by Georgia. The Huskers led the contest en route to a 24-19 victory. UGA outgained Nebraska in total offense 416 to 307 but committed one more turnover. Nebraska was led by Tommy Armstrong who went 6-of-14 for 163 yards with two TDs and one INT. Included in that performance was a school-record 99 yard TD pass to Quincy Enunwa in the third quarter. Ameer Abdullah had 27 carries for 122 yards and a TD, his 11th 100-yard rushing performance of the season. Enunwa led in the receiving department with four catches for 129 yards and two TDs. For his efforts, Quincy Enunwa was named Gator Bowl MVP.

Source:

Georgia Game starters

Individual honors

Big Ten Players of the Week
 Week 6 – Ameer Abdullah (Offensive Player of the Week)
 Week 10 – Jordan Westerkamp (Freshman of the Week)
 Week 11 – Randy Gregory (Defensive Player of the Week)
 Week 11 – Tommy Armstrong Jr. (Freshman of the Week)
 Week 13 – Pat Smith (Special Teams Player of the Week)

Big Ten All-Conference honors
All-Conference selections

All-Americans
 Ameer Abdullah (Associated Press – Third Team; Sports Illustrated – Honorable Mention; Phil Steele – Third Team)
 Spencer Long (CBS Sports – Third Team)

Academic All-Americans
 Spencer Long (First Team)
 Jake Long (Second Team)
 C.J. Zimmerer (Second Team)

Nebraska team awards
Year-end annual team awards:

Team MVP: Ameer Abdullah
Offensive MVP: Quincy Enunwa
Defensive MVP: Randy Gregory
Special Teams MVP: Pat Smith
Offensive Captains: Quincy Enunwa, Spencer Long, Taylor Martinez, Ameer Abdullah
Defensive Captains: Jason Ankrah, Ciante Evans
Chamberlain Trophy: Jeremiah Sirles (Senior player that lives up to Cornhusker tradition)
Novak Trophy: Ron Kellogg III (Senior player who exemplifies courage despite all odds)
Fischer Native Son Award: Cole Pensick (Senior Nebraska native player)
Bobby Reynolds Award: Jake Long
Lifter of the Year: Ameer Abdullah
Walk-On of the Year: Sam Burtch
Offensive Scout Team MVP: Adam Taylor
Defensive Scout Team MVP: Courtney Love
Character Award: Taariq Allen, Mike Moudy, Scott Criss
Pat Clare Award: Taariq Allen
Husker Heart Award: Brandon Chapek

Rankings

Notes
 September 14, 2013 – A record crowd of 91,471 attended the game against UCLA

References

External links

Nebraska
Nebraska Cornhuskers football seasons
Gator Bowl champion seasons
Nebraska Cornhuskers football